Little Island is an island in the Potomac River in Washington, D.C., just south of Theodore Roosevelt Island and the Theodore Roosevelt Bridge.

Geography
Little Island is the sixth largest island in the District of Columbia. It is uninhabited, undeveloped, and entirely wooded. It is separated from Theodore Roosevelt Island by a small channel. The only access to it is by boat. It is not part of Theodore Roosevelt Island Park, although it is managed together with Theodore Roosevelt Island. The island is in the shape of a rounded triangle. Historically, the island was also known as South Island, Swan Island, and Small Island.

References

External links

Islands of the Potomac River
River islands of Washington, D.C.
George Washington Memorial Parkway
Northwest (Washington, D.C.)